Toni Bürgler (born 17 August 1957 in Rickenbach, Schwyz) is a Swiss former alpine skier who competed in the 1980 Winter Olympics.

External links
 sports-reference.com
 

1957 births
Living people
Swiss male alpine skiers
Olympic alpine skiers of Switzerland
Alpine skiers at the 1980 Winter Olympics
Sportspeople from the canton of Schwyz
20th-century Swiss people